William George Berry (18 August 1904 – 15 September 1972), known in England as Bill Berry and in Francophone nations as George Berry or Georges Berry, was an English professional footballer who made over 130 appearances as an outside left in the Football League for Brentford. He also played league football for Gillingham, Charlton Athletic, Crystal Palace and Bournemouth & Boscombe Athletic and after his retirement he had a 30-year management career with clubs in France, Belgium, Tunisia and Luxembourg.

Playing career

Early years 
An outside left, Berry began his career with the Royal Naval Depot team in Chatham, before joining Third Division South club Charlton Athletic in 1923. He made 11 league appearances and scored two goals for the club before moving to Gillingham, of the same division, in February 1924. Berry remained at Priestfield for two-and-a-half seasons and made 87 appearances and scoring 11 goals.

Brentford 
Together with Gillingham teammates Wally Barnard, Charlie Reddock, Charlie Butler and Joe Craddock, Berry followed former Gillingham manager Harry Curtis to Third Division South club Brentford in May 1926. He failed to fully make the outside left berth his own and was dropped to the reserve team for the 1929–30 season. He returned to the first team in good form during the 1930–31 season, scoring 19 goals in 37 appearances. The signing of Arthur Crompton in February 1932 signalled the beginning of the end of Berry's time at Griffin Park and after making just one appearance during the early months of the 1932–33 season, he left the club in November 1932. He made 148 appearances and scored 44 goals in just over five seasons with the Bees.

Later career 
In November 1932, Berry joined Third Division South club Crystal Palace in a part-exchange deal which saw Idris Hopkins move to Brentford. In what remained of the 1932–33 season, Berry scored four goals in 17 appearances, but in an unlucky twist, he lost his place to new signing Arthur Crompton, whose signing had cost him his place at Brentford a year earlier. He closed out his Football League career with a short spell at Bournemouth & Boscombe Athletic, before moving to France to join National club SC Fives in 1934, where he remained until his retirement as a player in 1937.

Managerial career 
Berry had a long and successful management career in France, Belgium, Tunisia and Luxembourg. He won the double with Lille OSC in the 1945–46 season and a Coupe de France with OGC Nice in 1953–54. Berry won the Tunisian National Championship twice, in 1955–56 with CS Hammam-Lif and in 1957–58 with Étoile Sportive du Sahel. He twice won the Luxembourg National Division with Jeunesse Esch (1958–59 and 1959–60) and once with Union Luxembourg (1961–62), in addition to one Luxembourg Cup with the latter club.

Personal life 
Berry was married to Winifred and had three children.

Career statistics

Honours 
Lille
 Division 1: 1945–46
 Coupe de France: 1945–46

Nice
 Coupe de France: 1953–54

CS Hammam-Lif
 Tunisian National Championship: 1955–56
Étoile Sportive du Sahel
 Tunisian National Championship: 1957–58

Jeunesse Esch
 Luxembourg National Division: 1958–59, 1959–60

Union Luxembourg
 Luxembourg National Division: 1961–62
 Luxembourg Cup: 1962–63

References

1904 births
1972 deaths
English footballers
Association football outside forwards
English Football League players
Ligue 1 players
Gillingham F.C. players
Brentford F.C. players
Charlton Athletic F.C. players
Crystal Palace F.C. players
AFC Bournemouth players
SC Fives players
English football managers
Ligue 1 managers
Lille OSC managers
Lierse S.K. managers
OGC Nice managers
CS Hammam-Lif managers
Étoile Sportive du Sahel managers
Footballers from the London Borough of Hackney
Jeunesse Esch managers
Union Luxembourg managers
English expatriate footballers
English expatriate sportspeople in France
English expatriate sportspeople in Tunisia
English expatriate sportspeople in Luxembourg
English expatriate football managers
Expatriate football managers in France
Expatriate football managers in Belgium
Expatriate football managers in Tunisia
Expatriate football managers in Luxembourg
20th-century Royal Navy personnel